This is a list of settlements in Kent by population based on the results of the 2011 census. The next United Kingdom census will take place in 2021. In 2011, there were 44 built-up area subdivisions with 5,000 or more inhabitants in Kent, shown in the table below.

See the List of places in Kent article for an extensive list of local places and districts.

Population ranking

See also

References 

 
Kent-related lists
Kent
Kent